Major General Zaw Hein (born  1974-1975) is a former Burmese military officer and incumbent commander of the Naypyidaw Command.

Military career 
Zaw Hein graduated from the 38th batch of the Defence Services Academy. He was appointed commander of the Naypyidaw Command on 25 August 2021. In March 2022, he was sanctioned by the American government for committing military atrocities and abuses in the aftermath of the 2021 Myanmar coup d'état.

Personal life 
Zaw Hein's father, Thein Aung, is a former brigadier general and chief minister of Ayeyarwady Region.

See also 

 2021 Myanmar coup d'état
 State Administration Council
 Tatmadaw

References 

Living people
Burmese generals
Defence Services Academy alumni
Year of birth missing (living people)